The James C. Hendy Memorial Award is presented annually to an executive who has made the most outstanding contribution to the American Hockey League.

The award is named after Jim Hendy, a long-time contributor to the AHL and the general manager of the Cleveland Barons until his death in 1961.

Winners
Reference:

† awarded posthumously

References

External links
Official AHL website
AHL Hall of Fame

American Hockey League trophies and awards